Corymbia confertiflora, commonly known as the broad-leaved carbeen or the rough leaf cabbage gum, is a species of tree that is endemic to northern Australia. It has rough, tessellated bark near the base of the trunk, smooth white to pale grey bark above, a crown of both intermediate and adult leaves, large numbers of flower buds borne on leafless sections of branchlets in groups of seven, creamy white flowers and cylindrical to barrel-shaped or bell-shaped fruit.

Description
It has rough, tessellated dark grey bark near the base, then abruptly white to pale grey bark above, the smooth bark shed in thin flakes. The tree is usually deciduous in the dry season. Flowering occurs from July to December and the flowers are creamy white.

Taxonomy and naming
The broad-leaved carbeen was first formally described in an 1859 manuscript by Ferdinand von Mueller who gave it the name Eucalyptus floribunda. The name E. floribunda was already in use (now Angophora floribunda) and when Richard Kippist entered Mueller's description in the Journal of the Proceedings of the Linnean Society, Botany, he changed the name to E. confertiflora. Under the rules of botanical nomenclature, the name is therefore attributed to Kippist, even though Mueller supplied the description. In 1995 Kenneth Hill and Lawrence Alexander Sidney Johnson changed the name to Corymbia confertiflora in the journal Telopea. The specific epithet (confertiflora) is derived from the Latin confertus meaning "crowded" and -florus meaning "-flowered", referring to the crowded flowers.

Distribution and habitat
Corymbia confertiflora is widespread in northern Australia and occurs from the Kimberley region of Western Australia, through the Top End of the Northern Territory and south-eastern Arnhem Land, then near-coastal areas around the Gulf of Carpentaria to near Townsville and the Kennedy River in Queensland. It grows in open woodland and forest on plains and levees, and is often associated with limestone.

See also
 List of Corymbia species

References

confertiflora
Myrtales of Australia
Rosids of Western Australia
Plants described in 1859
Taxa named by Richard Kippist